Nain is an unincorporated community in Frederick County, Virginia, United States. Nain is located northwest of Winchester along the North Frederick Pike (U.S. Highway 522). The community is situated within a gap in Little North Mountain and Flint Ridge.

References

Unincorporated communities in Frederick County, Virginia
Unincorporated communities in Virginia